The flat-billed vireo (Vireo nanus) is a species of bird in the family Vireonidae. It is endemic to the Caribbean island of Hispaniola (split between Haiti and the Dominican Republic).

Habitat
Its natural habitat is subtropical or tropical dry forests.

References

flat-billed vireo
Endemic birds of Hispaniola
Birds of the Dominican Republic
Birds of Haiti
Endemic birds of the Caribbean
flat-billed vireo
flat-billed vireo
Taxonomy articles created by Polbot